State Highway 285 (SH 285) is a state highway that runs from Riviera in southern Texas, near Corpus Christi, west to Hebbronville.

Route description
Beginning at a junction with US 77 (Future I-69E) at Riviera in Kleberg County, SH 285 runs southwest and west to a junction with US 281 (Future I-69C) at Falfurrias in Brooks County. In Riviera the highway is known as Olive Avenue; in Falfurrias it is known as Rice Street. SH 285 continues northwest and west to a junction with SH 339 and then to its final junction with SH 16 at Hebbronville in Jim Hogg County, where the route is known as Fal Street.
SH 285 was designated on March 31, 1939, from Falfurrias to Hebbronville. On September 26, 1939 as part of a general redescription of the state highway system, SH 285 was extended east to its current end, replacing a part of SH 16. Most of the terrain covered by SH 285 is lightly populated ranch and oil country.

Junction list

References

External links
Texas official travel map at the Texas Department of Transportation (Adobe Acrobat format, magnification required for legibility)
Satellite image of junction of SH 285 with US 281 at Google Maps

285
Transportation in Jim Hogg County, Texas
Transportation in Brooks County, Texas
Transportation in Kleberg County, Texas